René Unglaube (born 6 November 1965 in East Berlin) is a former professional German footballer.

Unglaube made a total of 34 appearances in the Fußball-Bundesliga during his playing career.

References

External links 
 

1965 births
Living people
Footballers from Berlin
East German footballers
East Germany under-21 international footballers
German footballers
Association football forwards
Bundesliga players
2. Bundesliga players
1. FC Union Berlin players
1. FC Frankfurt players
Hertha BSC players
SG Wattenscheid 09 players
Tennis Borussia Berlin players